Victoria Zampa (born 11 April 1995) is a Cypriot footballer who plays as a defender for Nea Salamina Famagouste and the Cyprus women's national team.

Career
Zampa has been capped for the Cyprus national team, appearing for the team during the UEFA Women's Euro 2021 qualifying cycle.

References

External links
 
 
 

1995 births
Living people
Women's association football defenders
Cypriot women's footballers
Cyprus women's international footballers
Apollon Ladies F.C. players